There have been several ships called Nova Scotia :

 , British Royal Navy ships
 
 , British Royal Mail Ships
 , a Furness Withy British Royal Mail Ship
 , replacement for 1926-built RMS Nova Scotia
 , motor vessel named Nova Scotia, replacement for 1947-built RMS Nova Scotia

See also
Nova Scotia (disambiguation)

Ship names